Zafar Alam may refer to:
 Zafar Alam (Uttar Pradesh politician) (born 1944)
 Zafar Alam (Bihar politician)